The Richmond Charities is an almshouse charity based in the London Borough of Richmond upon Thames with its origins dating back to 1600. The charity provides affordable housing  for people in housing need. It also administers two relief-in-need welfare charities, a relief-in-sickness charity and a very small charity that awards small quarterly grants to four deserving spinsters.

The charity is an amalgamation of five Richmond almshouse charities and a Twickenham almshouse charity that was itself formed from 27 united charities.

Richmond Charities manages 124 almshouses, mainly of one-bedroom cottages and bungalows, in Richmond and Twickenham: 50 at Hickey's Almshouses; 9 at Houblon's; 10 at Bishop Duppa's (founded by Brian Duppa, Bishop of Chichester); 4 at Queen Elizabeth's; 18 at Michel's; 5 at Benn's Walk, 18 at Church Estate and 10 at Candler (Twickenham). In addition at Hickey's, there is a chapel dedicated to St Francis of Assisi, the chaplain's house and two lodges for staff. The almshouses are for local people aged over 65, who are of limited means and require an improvement in their living conditions.

The charity's area of benefit is London Borough of Richmond upon Thames, in which the majority of the almshouse residents will have been living at the time of their appointment, but limited provision is made for the appointment of residents irrespective of their former place of residence. Preference is given to applicants living in private rented property.

As recently as 1943, the residents of Richmond Charities' Almshouses received a monthly allowance of £2 5s. (£2.25p), together with three tons of coal a year, a dress or suit of clothes every other year, or a great coat every fifth year. Pensions continued to be paid for some years, but the position has now entirely changed, in that, where necessary, residents receive financial support within the state welfare system. They pay for the provision of central heating, where this is provided, and in addition pay a subsidised weekly maintenance contribution (WMC) towards the maintenance of the almshouses.

Residents pay their own household bills. They occupy the almshouses as beneficiaries of a charitable trust and do not have security of tenure. There are no longer any qualifications with regard to gender or religion.

Richmond Charities has an endowment that has to be used for the benefit of its residents.

Governance

The governing body of the charity is a board of twelve trustees. Trustees are unpaid and must live or work in Richmond or have special knowledge of it. The Board comprises one ex-officio trustee who is the leader of the Richmond team ministry, two trustees nominated by Richmond upon Thames London Borough Council, one trustee nominated by the Parish of St Mary's, Twickenham and eight co-opted trustees.

The board of trustees meets six times a year. Sub-committees meet to deal with finance, property, risk management, welfare, interviewing and grants.

Staff
Juliet Ames-Lewis is the Director.

The staff employed on the almshouses estates consists of a chaplain, scheme managers, home-help, health & safety officer, caretaker and decorator. The role of the scheme manager is to look after the almshouse estate and act as a facilitator, monitoring the well-being of the residents and to call in the appropriate services when required.

References

External links
Official website

Charities based in London
Non-profit organisations based in the United Kingdom
Organisations based in the London Borough of Richmond upon Thames